Peter Jordan (also known as Rocki Rolletti) is a Canadian actor, musician, and television presenter. He is best known for the work series It's a Living, through which aired on CBC Television from 1989 to 2003.

Career 
Jordan was based in Winnipeg, Manitoba, for many years, where he was a regular contributor to the local CBWT's news and documentary programs 24Hours and 24Hours Late Night in the 1980s.

In the 1980s, using his Rocki Rolletti persona, Jordan helped to forge a cultural link between flamingos and the working-class suburb of Transcona, Winnipeg, with his satirical song "Transcona Anthem".

Jordan won the 1998 and 2000 Gemini Awards for Best Host Lifestyle or Performing Arts Program or Series for his work on It's a Living, from 

When the full hour of news returned to CBWT in Winnipeg on February 19, it was announced that Jordan would host a new segment called W6 (Who, What, When, Where, Why, Winnipeg).

In addition to his work on television as a host and newsman, Jordan played roles in films and television series filmed in Manitoba, including: the 1986 historical film Mistress Madeleine; the 1996 Showtime television movie Heck's Way Home, starring Alan Arkin; the 2006 episode "Family Portrait" of Falcon Beach; the 2007 Canadian drama film The Stone Angel, starring Ellen Burstyn; the 2008 thriller The Lazarus Project, starring Paul Walker and Piper Perabo; and the 2009 romantic comedy New in Town, starring Renée Zellweger and Harry Connick Jr.

Filmography

Film

Television

References

External links 
 
 CBC Television - It's A Living website (archived 2004)
 cbc.ca - Peter Jordan bio (archived 2004)
 Gemini Awards - Peter Jordan

People from Winnipeg
Canadian television hosts
Canadian expatriates in Germany
Hochschule für Musik und Theater Hamburg alumni
Living people
Year of birth missing (living people)